Bah Ndaw (also spelled N'Daw, N'Dah, and N'Daou; born 23 August 1950) is a Malian military officer and politician who served as the president of Mali between 25 September 2020 and 24 May 2021 when he was overthrown during the 2021 Malian coup d'état. Between May 2014 and January 2015 he was Minister of Defense.

Early life and education
Ndaw was born on 23 August 1950 in San, Mali. He joined the Malian Armed Forces as a volunteer in 1973 and graduated from the Joint Military School (EMIA) in Koulikoro the same year. In 1974 he was sent to the Soviet Union to receive helicopter training.

Military and political career
In 1977, Ndaw became part of the Malian Air Force. At one point Ndaw served as an aide-de-camp to Malian President Moussa Traoré. He resigned from this position in 1990 in protest of interference by Traoré's wife with government affairs. Under President Alpha Oumar Konaré Ndaw served as deputy chief of staff of the Malian Air Force between 1992 and 2002. In 1994 he graduated from the École de guerre in Paris, France. In 2003 Ndaw became chief of staff of the Malian Air Force. During his career he also served as deputy chief of staff of the Malian National Guard. From 2008 until his retirement in 2012 he was head of the Bureau for veterans' affairs and war victims. He retired with the rank of Colonel-major.

On 28 May 2014 Ndaw succeeded Soumeylou Boubèye Maïga as Minister of Defense under President Ibrahim Boubacar Keïta. During his time in office he signed a defense agreement with France. He also worked on a reorganization of the Malian Armed Forces.

Transitional interim president
On 21 September 2020, after the coup d'état a few weeks before, Ndaw was named president by a group of 17 electors. Assimi Goïta was appointed vice president. Their interim government was scheduled to preside over a period of 18 months after the 2020 Malian coup d'état. A spokesperson for political-religious leader Mahmoud Dicko praised his nomination as president. Leaders of the M5-RFP, active since the 2020 Malian protests, also signalled support. Ndaw was inaugurated on 25 September.

After officially assuming office Ndaw stated he would fight against corruption, electoral fraud and to respect previously made international agreements. He also indicated that he would continue the fight against terrorist forces and prevent abuse of civilians by the Malian armed forces. Following Ndaw's inauguration, Jean-Claude Brou, the President of Economic Community of West African States (ECOWAS) Commission, stated that ECOWAS would only lift the embargo against Mali if a civilian Prime Minister was appointed by Ndaw. On 27 September Ndaw named Moctar Ouane as Prime Minister.

On 24 May 2021, Ndaw and Ouane were detained by the military and taken to Kati military base nearby Malian capital Bamako. The next day, the UN Secretary-General António Guterres called for their immediate release. On 26 May, Ndaw announced his resignation.

On 27 August 2021, Ndaw was released from house arrest.

Awards and honors
He is an officer of the National Order of Mali. Ndaw is a recipient of the Medal of Military Merit as well as the Medal of National Merit.

See also

References

1950 births
Defense ministers of Mali
Living people
Malian Muslims
Malian military personnel
Officers of the National Order of Mali
People from Ségou Region
Presidents of Mali
21st-century Malian people